This is a list of rivers in Myanmar (also known as Burma).

This list is arranged by drainage basin from east to west, with respective tributaries indented under each larger stream's name.

Indian Ocean

 Nāf River
 Kaladan River
 Lemro River
 Mayu River
 Kaleindaung River
 Pathein River (Bassein River)
 A-thút
 Dagā River
 Pyanmalot River (Pyamalaw River)
 Irrawaddy River (Ayeyarwady River)
 Lai Za Stream
 Mung Lai Stream
 Yin River
 Mon River
 Yaw River
 Kyaw River
 Chindwin River
 Myittha River
 Manipur River
 Uyu River
 Tizu River
 Mu River
 Myitnge River
 Zawgyi River
 Shweli River
 Taping River
 N'Mai River
 Mali River
 Thandi River
 Yangon River (Rangoon River) (Hlaing River)
 Bago River (Pegu River)
 Myitmaka River
 Sittaung River
 Phyu Creek
 Kha Paung Creek
 Sinthay River
 Paunglaung River
 Bilin River
 Salween River (Thanlwin River)
 Ataran River
 Zami River
 Winyaw River
 Gyaing River
 Haungtharaw River
 Yunzalin River
 Moei River (Thaungyin River)
 Pawn River
 Pilu River
 Pai River
 Teng River
 Hsim River
 Nam Pang River
 Nanding River
 Ye River
 Heinze River
 Dawei River (Tavoy River)
 Great Tenasserim River (Tanintharyi River)
 Lenya River
 Kraburi River (Pakchan River)
 Dapein River
 Tarpein River 
 Paung Laung River
 Chaungmagyi River

Pacific Ocean
 Mekong
 Kok River
 Ruak River
 Loi River

See also

References
 Rand McNally, The New International Atlas, 1993.

External links
Water Quality Management at River Basin in Myanmar
Myanmar Water resources. Aquastat, FAO.

 
Myanmar
Rivers